Sora Suzuki (鈴木 翔天, born November 29, 1992 in Asahi-ku, Yokohama, Kanagawa Prefecture) is a Japanese professional baseball pitcher for the Tohoku Rakuten Golden Eagles in Japan's Nippon Professional Baseball. He made his debut in 2020.

External links

NPB stats

1992 births
Living people
Japanese baseball players
Nippon Professional Baseball pitchers
Tohoku Rakuten Golden Eagles players
Baseball people from Kanagawa Prefecture